Indonesia Institute for Management Development IPMI Business School was found in 1985, when Minister Prof. Dr. Ali Wardana formally opened the first business school in Indonesia in the English language. Currently, the Indonesia Institute for Management Development IPMI Business School changed the name to IPMI International business school

Business schools in Indonesia